Szabolcs Vidrai (born 26 March 1977) is a Hungarian former competitive figure skater. His highest placement at the European Championships was 10th, in 1996, and his highest placement at the World Championships was 10th, in 1998. He placed 13th at the 1998 Olympics.

After retiring from competition, Vidrai began working as a coach. His former and current students include Viktória Pavuk, Fanni Forgo, and Kristof Forgo (Hungarian junior national champions).

Programs

Results
GP: Champions Series/Grand Prix

References

External links
 Figure Skating Corner profile

Hungarian male single skaters
Olympic figure skaters of Hungary
Figure skaters at the 1998 Winter Olympics
Hungarian figure skating coaches
1977 births
Living people
Figure skaters from Budapest